Baldisimo is a surname. Notable people with the surname include:

 Kajo Baldisimo, Filipino comic book artist
 Matthew Baldisimo (born 1998), Filipino-Canadian soccer player
 Michael Baldisimo (born 2000), Filipino-Canadian soccer player, brother of Matthew